The Argentine Islands are a group of islands in the Wilhelm Archipelago of Antarctica, situated  southwest of Petermann Island, and  northwest of Cape Tuxen on Kyiv Peninsula in Graham Land. They were discovered by the French Antarctic Expedition, 1903–05, under Jean-Baptiste Charcot, and named by him for the Argentine Republic, in appreciation of that government's support of his expedition.

History
The British Graham Land Expedition under John Riddoch Rymill was based in the Argentine Islands in 1935 and conducted a thorough survey of them. The expedition built a hut on Winter Island, which was used as their northern base; it was left in place at the end of the expedition, but destroyed circa 1946. The following year, the British Falkland Islands Dependencies Survey established a permanent base on the same site, as "Base F" (or "Argentine Islands"); the main building from this base, Wordie House, is now a protected historic site (HSM-62). The base was moved to Galindez Island in 1954, renamed "Faraday" in 1977, and transferred to the Ukrainian Antarctic program in 1996, who continue to operate it as Vernadsky Research Base.

Climate
The Argentine Islands have a polar climate that lies in the transition zone between an ice cap climate and a tundra climate, displaying an unusually continental version of that climate for being on the ocean.

List of islands
Black Island
Corner Island
Corner Rock
Galindez Island
Skua Island
Winter Island

See also 
 List of Antarctic and subantarctic islands

References 

Islands of the Wilhelm Archipelago